JCA may refer to:

Computing 
 Java Cryptography Architecture
 Java EE Connector Architecture, for connecting application servers and enterprise information systems (EIS)

Military 
 Joint capability areas, US Department of Defense listing of military capabilities
 Joint Cargo Aircraft, US Army and Air Force designation for the C-27 Spartan
 Joint Combat Aircraft, Royal Navy and RAF designation for the F-35 Joint Strike Fighter

Organizations 
 Camp JCA Shalom, a sleep-away camp in Malibu, California
 Jain Center of America, a Jain temple in New York, United States
 Japan Cricket Association, the governing body for cricket in Japan
 Japan Chess Association, the governing body for chess in Japan
 Japanese Cancer Association, a cancer research association in Japan
 Jewish Colonization Association, founded 1891 to facilitate emigration of Jews
 Joliet Catholic Academy, Illinois, US
 Josephite Community Aid, Australian charity founded in 1986

Publications 
 Journal of Computational Acoustics

Other uses 
 Juvenile chronic arthritis
 Jean-Claude Ades, German electronic music producer
 Jackie Chan Adventures